Gary Freeman may refer to:

Gary Freeman (basketball) (born 1948), NBA player in 1970
Gary Freeman (illustrator) (born 1951), American sci-fi & fantasy artist
Gary Freeman (rugby league) (born 1962), New Zealand rugby league player
Gary Freeman (sculptor) (1937–2014), sculptor from Indianapolis, Indiana